Rubus costaricanus is a Mesoamerican species of brambles in the rose family. It grows in southern Mexico and Central America, from Chiapas to Panamá.

Rubus costaricanus is a shrub sometimes more than 3 meters tall, with curved prickles. Leaves are compound with 3 or 5 leaflets.

References

costaricanus
Flora of Chiapas
Flora of Central America
Flora of Costa Rica
Plants described in 1853